William James McGill (27 February 1922 – 19 October 1997) was an American psychologist, author, and academic administrator. He was the 16th president of Columbia University and the 3rd chancellor of the University of California San Diego.

Biography
McGill was born in New York City to a musician and labor organizer. He attended parochial Catholic schools and in 1939 began his college education at Fordham University, where he earned bachelor's and master's degrees in psychology. In 1953 he was awarded a doctorate in experimental psychology from Harvard University.

McGill was an assistant professor at Massachusetts Institute of Technology until 1956 and then joined Columbia. He was chairman of the psychology department from 1961 to 1963 and left in 1965 to help found a psychology department at the University of California San Diego (UCSD). In 1968 he accepted the job of chancellor at UCSD, after the first five offered the position turned it down.

In 1970 he left California to become the president of Columbia University from 1970 to 1980.
From 1979 to 1981 McGill chaired Jimmy Carter's Presidential Commission for a National Agenda for the Eighties.

Notes

References
 
 "William James McGill." Scribner Encyclopedia of American Lives, Volume 5: 1997-1999. Charles Scribner's Sons, 2002.
 "William James McGill." Contemporary Authors Online, Gale, 2007.

Further reading
 "In memoriam William James McGill", Journal of Mathematical Psychology, 42, 1-4, 1998.

External links 
 William J. McGill Papers MSS 88. Special Collections & Archives, UC San Diego Library.

1922 births
1997 deaths
Chancellors of the University of California, San Diego
Columbia University faculty
Fordham University alumni
Harvard University alumni
Educators from New York City
Massachusetts Institute of Technology faculty
Presidents of Columbia University
20th-century American academics